My Big Bossing is a Filipino comedy anthology film starring Vic Sotto, Ryzza Mae Dizon and Marian Rivera. The standalone sequel to the 2013 family film My Little Bossings, it is one of the official entries of the 40th Metro Manila Film Festival, and was released on December 25, 2014.

Unlike its predecessor, My Big Bossing features an anthology of children's fantasy stories and has no connection with the previous film. The film also revolves around Ryzza's portrayals of different characters throughout the film's story arcs.

Plot

Sirena 
A little girl named Jessa wishes to be a mermaid. The wish was granted when the girl was drowned in swimming pool after meeting a witch (Pauleen Luna), transforming her into a mermaid-goldfish hybrid.

Taktak 
A little girl dies and helps an unbeliever who works as a reporter to cope with his beliefs.

Prinsesa 
A princess whose name is Biiktoria was said to be an ugly girl so the sister of the Queen, together with her husband planned to exchange her son as a prince of the kingdom and someday become a king. The princess lives together with the pigs so she thinks that she is also a pig. In the end, Torius proclaimed that the princess' name came from his, therefore she was named Victoria. She was recognized by his father, the king, who was sick and accepted her daughter even if she is ugly. Dexie starred also in this movie

Cast

Sirena 
Vic Sotto as Vince
Ryzza Mae Dizon as Jessa
Manilyn Reynes as Jessa's mother
Pauleen Luna as Tandang Wishy
Wally Bayola as the barangay captain

Taktak 
Vic Sotto as Bossing
Ryzza Mae Dizon as Angel
Marian Rivera as Clarissa
Jose Manalo 
Paolo Ballesteros
Chlaui Malayao
Cris Villonco
Alwyn Uytingco

Prinsesa 
Vic Sotto as Torius
Ryzza Mae Dizon as Biiktoria/Victoria
Nikki Gil as Prinsesa Reyna Beatriz
Alonzo Muhlach as Prinsipe Vladimir
Zoren Legaspi
Niño Muhlach
Maricar de Mesa
Sef Cadayona
Rafa Siguion-Reyna
Ruby Rodriguez

References

External links 
 

2014 fantasy films
2014 films
Philippine anthology films
Filipino-language films
OctoArts Films films
M-Zet Productions films
APT Entertainment films
Philippine urban fantasy films
Films directed by Tony Y. Reyes
Films directed by Marlon N. Rivera